Regina—Lumsden was a federal electoral district in the province of Saskatchewan, Canada, that was represented in the House of Commons of Canada from 1988 to 1997.

This riding was created in 1987 from parts of Moose Jaw and Regina West ridings. Regina—Lumsden consisted of the western portion of the Province of Saskatchewan.

The electoral district was abolished in 1996 when it was re-distributed between Palliser, Qu'Appelle and Regina—Arm River ridings.

Electoral history

See also 

 List of Canadian federal electoral districts
 Past Canadian electoral districts

External links 
 

Former federal electoral districts of Saskatchewan